Haemus Mountains can refer to the following:

Haemus Mons was an ancient Greek name for the Balkan mountains
Montes Haemus is a mountain range on the Moon
Haemus Montes is the name of a ridge on Io, a moon of Jupiter

See also
 List of mountains on the Moon